The hen harrier (Circus cyaneus) is a bird of prey. It breeds in Eurasia. The term "hen harrier" refers to its former habit of preying on free-ranging fowl.

It migrates to more southerly areas in winter. Eurasian birds move to southern Europe and southern temperate Asia. In the mildest regions, such as France and Great Britain, hen harriers may be present all year, but the higher ground is largely deserted in winter.

The northern harrier was formerly considered to be a subspecies of the hen harrier.

Taxonomy
In 1758 the English naturalist George Edwards included an illustration and a description of the hen harrier in the first volume of his Gleanings of Natural History. He used the English name "The blue hawk". Edwards based his hand-coloured etching on a bird that had been shot near London. When in 1766 the Swedish naturalist Carl Linnaeus updated his Systema Naturae for the twelfth edition, he placed the hen harrier with the falcons and eagles in the genus Falco.  Linnaeus included a brief description, coined the binomial name Falco cyaneus and cited Edwards' work. The hen harrier is now placed in the genus Circus that was introduced by the French naturalist Bernard Germain de Lacépède in 1799. The genus name Circus is derived from the Ancient Greek kirkos, referring to a bird of prey named for its circling flight (kirkos, "circle"). The specific epithet cyaneus is from Latin and means "dark blue". The species is monotypic: no subspecies are recognised.

The hen harrier was formerly considered to be conspecific with the northern harrier.

Description

It resembles other harriers in having distinct male and female plumages. It is relatively long winged and long tailed.

The male is mainly grey above and white below except for the upper breast, which is grey like the upperparts, and the rump, which is white; the wings are grey with black wingtips. The female is brown above with white upper tail coverts, hence females, and the similar juveniles, are often called "ringtails". Their underparts are buff streaked with brown. Immatures look like females but with less distinct barring, dark brown secondaries dark brown and less-streaked belly.

The female gives a whistled piih-eh when receiving food from the male, and her alarm call is chit-it-it-it-it-et-it. The male calls chek-chek-chek, with a more bouncing chuk-uk-uk-uk during his display flight.

Behaviour
This medium-sized raptor breeds on moorland, bogs, prairies, farmland coastal prairies, marshes, grasslands, swamps and other assorted open areas.

These, are the one of the few raptorial birds known to practice polygyny – one male mates with several females. Up to five females have been known to mate with one male in a season. A supplementary feeding experiment on the Orkney islands showed that rates of polygyny were influenced by food levels; males provided with extra food had more breeding females than 'control' males that received no extra food.

The nest is built on the ground or on a mound of dirt or vegetation. Nests are made of sticks and are lined inside with grass and leaves. Four to eight (exceptionally 2 to 10) whitish eggs are laid. The eggs are incubated mostly by the female for 31 to 32 days. When incubating eggs, the female sits on the nest while the male hunts and brings food to her and the chicks. The male will help feed chicks after they hatch, but does not usually watch them for a greater period of time than around 5 minutes. The male usually passes off food to the female, which she then feeds to the young, although later the female will capture food and simply drop into the nest for her nestlings to eat. The chicks fledge at around 36 days old, though breeding maturity is not reached until 2 years in females and 3 years in males.

In winter, the hen harrier is a bird of open country, and will then roost communally, often with merlins and marsh harriers. There is now an accepted record of transatlantic vagrancy by the northern harrier, with a juvenile being recorded in Scilly, Great Britain from October 1982 to June 1983.

Hunting behaviour
This is a typical harrier, which hunts on long wings held in a shallow V in its low flight during which the bird closely hugs the contours of the land below it. Northern or hen harriers hunt primarily small mammals, as do most harriers. Up to 95% of the diet comprises small mammals. However, birds are hunted with some regularity as well, especially by males. Preferred avian prey include passerines of open country (i.e. sparrows, larks, pipits), small shorebirds and the young of waterfowl and galliforms. Supplementing the diet occasionally are amphibians (especially frogs), reptiles and insects (especially orthopterans). The species has been observed to hunt bats if these are available. Larger prey, such as rabbits and adult ducks are taken sometimes and harriers have been known to subdue these by drowning them in water. Harriers hunt by surprising prey while flying low to the ground in open areas, as they drift low over fields and moors. The harriers circle an area several times listening and looking for prey. Harriers use hearing regularly to find prey, as they have exceptionally good hearing for diurnal raptors, this being the function of their owl-like facial disc. This harrier tends to be a very vocal bird while it glides over its hunting ground.

Mortality and competition
Little information is available on longevity in hen harriers. The longest-lived known bird is 16 years and 5 months. However, adults rarely live more than 8 years. Early mortality mainly results from predation. Predators of eggs and nestlings include raccoons, skunks, badgers, foxes, crows and ravens, dogs and owls. Both parents attack potential predators with alarm calls and striking with talons. Short-eared owls are natural competitors of this species that favor the same prey and habitat, as well as having a similarly broad distribution. Occasionally, both harriers and short-eared owls will harass each other until the victim drops its prey and it can be stolen, a practice known as kleptoparasitism. Most commonly, the harriers are the aggressors pirating prey from owls.

Status
This species has a large range. There is evidence of a population decline, but the species is not believed to be approaching the thresholds for the population decline criterion of the IUCN Red List (i.e., declining more than 30% in ten years or three generations). It is therefore classified as "least concern". In the United Kingdom, however, hen harrier populations are in a critical condition, due to habitat loss and illegal killing on grouse moors. In 2012 only 617 pairs remained, representing a fall of 20% from 2004.

Relationship with humans
In some parts of Europe people believed that seeing a harrier perched on a house was a sign that three people would die. Unlike many raptors, hen harriers have historically been seen favorably by farmers because they eat predators of quail eggs and mice that damage crops. Harriers are sometimes called "good hawks" because they pose no threat to poultry as some hawks do.

Forestry and hen harriers

The hen harrier is a bird of open habitats such as heather moorland and extensive agriculture. However, much of its range, particularly in Ireland and parts of western Britain, has been (and continues to be) afforested, predominantly with non-native conifers such as Sitka spruce (Picea sitchensis) from North America. Where forests replace habitats that were used by hen harriers they will therefore tend to reduce overall habitat availability. However, where afforestation takes place in areas that were previously underutilised by hen harriers, it may increase the value of such areas to this species in the long-term. Areas dominated by forestry may remain suitable to hen harriers provided that a mosaic of age classes is maintained within the forest, such that areas of young, pre-thicket forest are always available.

References

External links

 The Langholm Moor Demonstration Project
 Field Guide Page on Flickr
 Range in Iran (in Persian)
 Ageing and sexing (PDF; 4.3 MB) by Javier Blasco-Zumeta & Gerd-Michael Heinze
 
 RSPB Skydancer website 
 
 

hen harrier
Birds of prey of Eurasia
hen harrier
hen harrier